Huautla could mean any of the following locations in Mexico:

Huautla, Hidalgo in central-eastern Mexico
Huautla, Morelos in South-Central Mexico
Sierra de Huautla, a mountain range in south-central Mexico
Huautla de Jiménez, Oaxaca
San Miguel Huautla, Oaxaca
Sistema Huautla, Oaxaca, the deepest cave system in the Western Hemisphere